"Beer Thirty" is a song written by Ronnie Dunn and Terry McBride, and recorded by American country music duo Brooks & Dunn.  It was released in October 1999 as the second single from the album Tight Rope.  The song reached #19 on the Billboard Hot Country Singles & Tracks chart.

Chart performance

References

1999 singles
1999 songs
Brooks & Dunn songs
Songs written by Ronnie Dunn
Songs written by Terry McBride (musician)
Song recordings produced by Byron Gallimore
Arista Nashville singles